Gennaro Sangiuliano (born 6 June 1962) is an Italian journalist, writer and politician, since 22 October 2022 minister of culture in the Meloni Cabinet. He was the director of the Rome newspaper in Naples from 1996 to 2001 and of TG2 from 2018 to 2022 and the deputy director of the Libero newspaper and of TG1 from 2009 to 2018.

Biography 
Sangiuliano attended the classical high school "A. Pansini" of Naples, then he graduated in Law at the University of Naples "Federico II". Later he obtained a master's degree in European private law at Sapienza - University of Rome and cum laude the research doctorate in Law and Economics at the "Federico II" University of Naples. He is an external lecturer in information law at LUMSA and in economics of financial intermediaries at Sapienza. In addition, since 2016 he has held the course of History of the economy and Libera Università Internazionale degli Studi Sociali Guido Carli and since 2015 he has been the director of the Journalism school of the University of Salerno. He is the professor of the Master in Journalism and Communication of the Università degli Studi Pegaso.

In journalism 
He works at Canale 8 in Naples, and entered the editorial office of Economy, a periodical considered by some to be close to Francesco De Lorenzo. Together with Ciro Paglia, historical editor-in-chief of the daily newspaper Il Mattino, he published the volume "Paradise: a journey into the deep north", in response to the controversial "Inferno" by Giorgio Bocca, which gets mixed reviews.

In the early 1990s Sangiuliano worked at L'Indipendente and then at the political editorial staff of the Roma newspaper in Naples (a newspaper close to Giuseppe Tatarella), of which he became director from 1996 to 2001. He was then head of the Roman editorial office and then deputy editor of the Libero newspaper under the direction of Vittorio Feltri. He also wrote at that time for the weekly L'Espresso and for the cultural pages of Il Sole24Ore. He started dealing with economics for the monthly North and South, the historic magazine founded by Francesco Compagna. He wrote for the Giornale di Napoli under the direction of Lino Jannuzzi , for Il Foglio by Giuliano Ferrara and for Il Giornale.

In 2010, on the occasion of the death of the former head of state Francesco Cossiga, Sangiuliano published a detailed article in Il Giornale in which he recalls the endorsement of the then president Giorgio Napolitano.

References 

1962 births
Living people
Meloni Cabinet
Culture ministers of Italy
21st-century Italian politicians
Italian neo-fascists
Journalists from Naples
University of Naples Federico II alumni
Writers from Naples
Italian male writers
Italian journalists